Carl Georg Christoph Beseler (2 November 1809 in Rödemis, now part of Husum – 28 August 1888 in Bad Harzburg) was a Prussian jurist and politician.

Beseler studied law at Kiel and Munich. He was forbidden to teach law in Kiel in 1833 due to his political activity, but he lectured at Göttingen, and Heidelberg. In 1835, he became a professor in Basel, 1837 in Rostock, 1842 in Greifswald and 1859 in Berlin. He was rector of the University of Berlin in 1862–1863, 1867–1868 and 1879–1880.

A liberal nationalist, Beseler was a member of the Frankfurt Parliament where he participated in writing the failed 1849 German constitution. From 1849 to 1852 and from 1857 to 1887 he was a member of the Prussian House of Lords, 1850 of the Erfurt Union Parliament and 1874 to 1877 of the Reichstag.

As a notable "Germanist" opponent of the "Romanists", led by Friedrich Carl von Savigny, Beseler advocated a "people's law" based on Germanic principles as opposed to the Romanists' "jurists' law". The notions of cooperative law and social law later enunciated by Otto von Gierke originate with Beseler. He was also involved in liberalising the codes of civil and criminal procedure, and in crafting the 1851 Prussian criminal code.

Beseler was the father of the general Hans Hartwig von Beseler and the jurist and politician Max von Beseler.

References

External links

1809 births
1888 deaths
People from Husum
People from the Duchy of Schleswig
German Lutherans
National Liberal Party (Germany) politicians
Members of the Frankfurt Parliament
Members of the Prussian House of Representatives
Members of the 2nd Reichstag of the German Empire
Members of the 3rd Reichstag of the German Empire
Members of the 4th Reichstag of the German Empire
Members of the Prussian House of Lords
Jurists from Schleswig-Holstein
University of Kiel alumni
Ludwig Maximilian University of Munich alumni
Academic staff of the University of Göttingen
Academic staff of Heidelberg University
Academic staff of the University of Basel
Academic staff of the University of Rostock
Academic staff of the University of Greifswald
Academic staff of the Humboldt University of Berlin
Presidents of the Humboldt University of Berlin
19th-century Lutherans